Montagu(e) Alan Smith (born 8 February 1944) is an English former professional rugby league footballer who played in the 1960s, 1970s and 1980s.

Background
Alan Smith was born in Overton, Wakefield, West Riding of Yorkshire, and as a child he lived on a farm in the village.

Playing career

International honours
Alan Smith won caps for England while at Leeds in 1968 against Wales, in 1970 against Wales, and France, in the 1975 Rugby League World Cup against Australia, and won caps for Great Britain while at Leeds in 1970 against Australia (2 matches), New Zealand (3 matches), in the 1970 Rugby League World Cup against Australia (2 matches), in 1971 against France (2 matches), and in 1973 against Australia.

Challenge Cup Final appearances
Alan Smith played , i.e. number 2, in Leeds' 11–10 victory over Wakefield Trinity in the 1968 Challenge Cup "Watersplash" Final during the 1967–68 season at Wembley Stadium, London on Saturday 11 May 1968, in front of a crowd of 87,100, played  in the 13–16 defeat by St. Helens in the 1972 Challenge Cup Final during the 1971–72 season at Wembley Stadium, London on Saturday 13 May 1972, and played  in the 16–7 victory over Widnes in the 1977 Challenge Cup Final during the 1976–77 season at Wembley Stadium, London on Saturday 7 May 1977, in front of a crowd of 80,871.

County Cup Final appearances
Alan Smith played , i.e. number 2, and scored a try in Leeds' 22–11 victory over Castleford in the 1968 Yorkshire County Cup Final during the 1968–69 season at Belle Vue, Wakefield on Saturday 19 October 1968, played , and scored 2-tries in the 23–7 victory over Featherstone Rovers in the 1970 Yorkshire County Cup Final during the 1970–71 season at Odsal Stadium, Bradford on Saturday 21 November 1970, played  in the 36–9 victory over Dewsbury in the 1972 Yorkshire County Cup Final during the 1972–73 season at Odsal Stadium, Bradford on Saturday 7 October 1972, played  in the 15–11 victory over Hull Kingston Rovers in the 1975 Yorkshire County Cup Final during the 1975–76 season at Headingley Rugby Stadium, Leeds on Saturday 15 November 1975, played , scored 2-tries, and was man of the match winning the White Rose Trophy in the 15–6 victory over Halifax in the 1979 Yorkshire County Cup Final during the 1979–80 season at Headingley Rugby Stadium, Leeds on Saturday 27 October 1979, and played , and scored a try in the 8–7 victory over Hull Kingston Rovers in the 1980 Yorkshire County Cup Final during the 1980–81 season at Fartown Ground, Huddersfield on Saturday 8 November 1980. The record for the most tries in a Yorkshire County Cup Final is 4-tries, and is jointly held by; Stan Moorhouse, Alan Smith, and Stanley Smith.

BBC2 Floodlit Trophy Final appearances
Alan Smith played , i.e. number 2, in Leeds' 9–5 victory over St. Helens in the 1970 BBC2 Floodlit Trophy Final during the 1970–71 season at Headingley Rugby Stadium, Leeds on Tuesday 15 December 1970.

Player's No.6 Trophy Final appearances
Alan Smith played , i.e. number 2, in Leeds' 12–7 victory over Salford in the 1972–73 Player's No.6 Trophy Final during the 1972–73 season at Fartown Ground, Huddersfield on Saturday 24 March 1973.

References

External links
Image "Paul Litton – Paul Litten dashes between two Leeds defenders at Odsal Stadium - Date: 13/12/1969" at rlhp.co.uk
Image "Syd Hynes Looks For A Pass - Leeds' Syd Hynes looks to send Alan Smith away as Peter Small covers for Bradford. - Date: 22/10/1972" at rlhp.co.uk
Rugby Cup Final 1968 at britishpathe.com

1944 births
Living people
England national rugby league team players
English rugby league players
Great Britain national rugby league team players
Leeds Rhinos players
People from Overton, West Yorkshire
Rugby league wingers
Rugby league players from Wakefield